The jacamars are a family, Galbulidae, of near passerine birds from tropical South and Central America, extending up to Mexico. The family contains five genera and 18 species. The family is closely related to the puffbirds, another Neotropical family, and the two families are often separated into their own order, Galbuliformes, separate from the Piciformes. They are principally birds of low-altitude woodlands and forests, and particularly of forest edge and canopy.

Taxonomy
The placement of the combined puffbird and jacamar lineage was in question, with some bone and muscle features suggesting they may be more closely related to the Coraciiformes. However, analysis of nuclear DNA in a 2003 study placed them as sister group to the rest of the Piciformes, also showing that the groups had developed zygodactyl feet before separating. Per Ericson and colleagues, in analysing genomic DNA, confirmed that puffbirds and jacamars were sister groups and their place in Piciformes.

Description
The jacamars are small to medium-sized perching birds,  in length and weighing . They are elegant, glossy birds with long bills and tails.  In appearance and behaviour they resemble the Old World bee-eaters, as most aerial insectivores tend to have short, wide bills rather than long, thin ones. The legs are short and weak, and the feet are zygodactylic (two forward-pointing toes, two backward-pointing). Their plumage is often bright and highly iridescent, although it is quite dull in a few species. There are minor differences in plumage based on sex, males often having a white patch on the breast.

Behaviour

Diet and feeding
Jacamars are insectivores, taking a variety of insect prey (many specialize on butterflies and moths) by hawking in the air. Birds sit in favoured perches and sally towards the prey when it is close enough. Only the great jacamar varies from the rest of the family, taking prey by gleaning and occasionally taking small lizards and spiders.

Breeding
The breeding systems of jacamars have not been studied in depth. They are thought to generally be monogamous, although a few species are thought to engage in cooperative breeding sometimes, with several adults sharing duties. The family nests in holes either in the soil or in arboreal termite mounds. Ground-nesting species usually nest in the banks of rivers (or, more recently, roads), although if these are not available they will nest in the soil held by the roots of fallen trees. Bank-nesting jacamars can sometimes be loosely colonial. Clutch sizes are between one and four eggs, and usually more than one. Both parents participate in incubation. Little is known about the incubation times of most species, but it lasts between 19 and 26 days in the rufous-tailed jacamar. Chicks are born with down feathers, unique among the piciformes.

Species

FAMILY: GALBULIDAE
 Genus: Galbalcyrhynchus
 White-eared jacamar, Galbalcyrhynchus leucotis
 Purus jacamar, Galbalcyrhynchus purusianus
 Genus: Brachygalba
 Dusky-backed jacamar, Brachygalba salmoni
 Pale-headed jacamar, Brachygalba goeringi
 Brown jacamar, Brachygalba lugubris
 White-throated jacamar, Brachygalba albogularis
 Genus: Jacamaralcyon
 Three-toed jacamar, Jacamaralcyon tridactyla
 Genus: Galbula
 Yellow-billed jacamar, Galbula albirostris
 Blue-necked jacamar, Galbula cyanicollis
 Rufous-tailed jacamar, Galbula ruficauda
 Green-tailed jacamar, Galbula galbula
 Coppery-chested jacamar, Galbula pastazae
 Bluish-fronted jacamar, Galbula cyanescens
 White-chinned jacamar, Galbula tombacea
 Purplish jacamar, Galbula chalcothorax
 Bronzy jacamar, Galbula leucogastra
 Paradise jacamar, Galbula dea
 Genus: Jacamerops
 Great jacamar, Jacamerops aureus

References

External links
 Jacamar videos in the Internet Bird Collection

 
Higher-level bird taxa restricted to the Neotropics
Taxa named by Nicholas Aylward Vigors